Starye Sharashli (İśke Şäräşle) is a rural locality (a selo) and the administrative centre of Starosharashlinsky Selsoviet, Bakalinsky District, Bashkortostan, Russia. The population was 410 as of 2010. There are 3 streets.

Geography 
Starye Sharashli is located 6 km north of Bakaly (the district's administrative centre) by road. Georgiyevka is the nearest rural locality.

References 

Rural localities in Bakalinsky District
Belebeyevsky Uyezd